Phantom Peak is in North Cascades National Park in the U.S. state of Washington.

References

External links
 Phantom Peak aerial photo: PBase

Mountains of Washington (state)
North Cascades National Park
Mountains of Whatcom County, Washington